was a Japanese lawyer and social activist. Fuse was posthumously awarded the Order of Merit for National Foundation in 2004 by the South Korean government for his efforts for Korean independence movement.

Early life 
Fuse was born in the rural Oshika District of Miyagi Prefecture in what is now part of the city of Ishinomaki. In his youth he was baptized in the Japanese Orthodox Church, and attended a seminary affiliated with the Holy Resurrection Cathedral in Tokyo, but dropped out after three months. In his youth, he was a pacifist and participated in various social movements, expressing an admiration for the Tolstoyan movement. After marriage he converted to his wife's faith of Nichiren Buddhism.

He attended the Tokyo Semmon Gakko, a predecessor of Waseda University, and the Meiji Law School, a predecessor of Meiji University, graduating from the latter in 1902. He passed the judge's exam at the age of 22 and thereafter worked as an assistant prosecutor in Utsunomiya, but resigned after less than a year.

Legal career 
Fuse then became a criminal lawyer. Although his career had a slow start, he rose to prominence after successfully defending a death penalty case (Fuse was a vocal opponent of the death penalty). By around 1920 he had become a successful attorney, handling 250 cases per year, including around four courtroom trials per year. In addition to his work as a criminal lawyer, he continued to be active in social issues involving the suppression of prostitution and election fraud.

Fuse became particularly famous for his representation of individuals involved in the Korean independence movement before World War II and was critical of the Japanese government for its handling of Koreans in Japan in the post-war era. He represented Korean clients in a number of instances. In 2000, his efforts were featured in a one-hour episode of the PD Notebook program on Munhwa Broadcasting, and in 2004, he was posthumously decorated with the Order of Merit for National Foundation by the Republic of Korea, becoming the only Japanese national in history to receive this honor.

Fuse ran as a left-wing candidate in the 1928 general election under the Labour-Farmer Party but was unsuccessful. Thereafter, he represented the Japan Communist Party in the wake of the March 15 incident, resulting in his indictment in 1929 and disbarment by the Supreme Court of Judicature in 1932. He was later imprisoned for one year for violating the Peace Preservation Law.

After the war, he continued his activities in the left-wing legal movement, and served as part of the defense team for the Mitaka incident in 1949. He died of cancer in 1953; his remains are interred at the temple of Jozai-ji in Toshima, Tokyo.

References

External links

1880 births
1953 deaths
People from Ishinomaki
20th-century Japanese lawyers
Japanese prosecutors
Japanese anti–death penalty activists
Deaths from cancer in Japan
Meiji University alumni
Korean independence movement
Recipients of the Order of Merit for National Foundation
Nichiren Buddhists